Sephisa princeps is a butterfly of the family Nymphalidae. It was described by Johann Heinrich Fixsen in 1887. It is found in the Russian Far East (Amur, Ussuri), north-eastern China and Korea. The habitat consists of oak forests.

Adults are on wing from July to August.

Females occur in tree crowns while males, usually solitary, often occur on puddles. The female lays eggs in a convolute leaf by some dozens at a time.

The larvae feed on Quercus mongolica. Larvae of first two instars live gregariously. There are a total of five instars. The pupation takes place in a pupa hanging on the leaf petiole.

Subspecies
Sephisa princeps princeps
Sephisa princeps tsekouensis  Nguyen, 1984 (China: Yunnan)
Sephisa princeps chinensis  Nguyen, 1984 (China: Hupei)

References

 Sephisa princeps at Insecta.pro

Butterflies described in 1887
Apaturinae
Butterflies of Asia